Vibeke Løkkeberg ( Kleivdal; born 22 January 1945) is a Norwegian film actress and director. She appeared in 12 films between 1967 and 1991. Her film Hud was screened in the Un Certain Regard section at the 1987 Cannes Film Festival.

Selected filmography 
 Liv (1967)
 Abort (1970)
 Love Is War (1971)
 Georgia, Georgia (1972)
 Løperjenten (1981)
 The Chieftain (1984)
 Hud (1986)
 Gazas Tårer (2010)

References

External links 

1945 births
Living people
Norwegian film actresses
Norwegian women film directors
Norwegian screenwriters
20th-century Norwegian actresses
21st-century Norwegian actresses
Norwegian women screenwriters